Alessandro Piccolomini (died 6 November 1661) was a Roman Catholic prelate who served as Bishop of Chiusi (1657–1661).

On 12 March 1657, Alessandro Piccolomini was appointed during the papacy of Pope Alexander VII as Bishop of Chiusi.
He served as Bishop of Chiusi until his death on 6 November 1661.

References

External links and additional sources
 (for Chronology of Bishops) 
 (for Chronology of Bishops) 

17th-century Italian Roman Catholic bishops
Bishops appointed by Pope Alexander VII
1661 deaths
Bishops of Chiusi